"Bella Notte" (Italian for "Beautiful Night") is a song for the 1955 animated motion picture Lady and the Tramp from Walt Disney Productions. The music is by Sonny Burke and the lyrics are by Peggy Lee. The song was performed in the film by George Givot, who also provided the voice of Tony. 

Peggy Lee recorded the song for herself for a 1955 Decca release with a choir and orchestra led by Victor Young. The song has also been recorded for a Disneyland album, sung by Bob Grabeau.

Ronnie Hilton recorded the song, and Siw Malmkvist recorded the song in Swedish, releasing it on a record in February 1956. The song has also been recorded by Vikingarna on the 1979 album Vikingarnas julparty and Christer Sjögren himself on the 1994 Christmas album När ljusen ska tändas därhemma.

Mark Salling, Kevin McHale, and Chord Overstreet recorded the song, and performed it on twenty-second episode and season two finale of Glee on May 24, 2011.

References

Songs about nights
1955 singles
1955 songs
Christer Sjögren songs
Siw Malmkvist songs
Vikingarna (band) songs
Songs with music by Sonny Burke
Songs written by Peggy Lee
Songs written for animated films
Disney songs
Love themes
Walt Disney Records singles
Lady and the Tramp